Channelsea Island is a small man-made island in the centre of the Channelsea River in East London, near Three Mills Island in the London Borough of Newham.

The island was the site of the Abbey Mill, dating back to at least the 12th century.

A series of derelict buildings located on the island, including remains of the Abbey Mill chemical works.

References 

Islands of London
Geography of the London Borough of Newham